Pax is a studio album by American jazz pianist Andrew Hill, featuring performances recorded in 1965 but not released on the Blue Note label until 1975 (as part of compilation album One for One). The album features Hill with tenor saxophonist Joe Henderson, trumpeter Freddie Hubbard, bassist Richard Davis and drummer Joe Chambers performing six of his compositions, with one alternate take added to the 2006 CD release.

Reception

The Allmusic review by Thom Jurek awarded the album 3½ stars, stating, "this is a semi-rough and wonderfully rowdy Hill date that deserves serious aural exploration".

Track listing
All compositions by Andrew Hill
 "Eris" - 10:42
 "Pax" - 7:13
 "Calliope" - 10:10
 "Euterpe" - 7:18
 "Erato" - 4:01
 "Roots 'n' Herbs" - 3:42
 "Euterpe" [alternate take] - 6:44

Personnel
Andrew Hill - piano
Freddie Hubbard - cornet (tracks 1-4 & 7)
Joe Henderson - tenor saxophone (tracks 1-4 & 7)
Richard Davis - bass
Joe Chambers - drums

References

Blue Note Records albums
Andrew Hill albums
2006 albums
Albums produced by Alfred Lion
Albums recorded at Van Gelder Studio